Hirshabelle, officially Hirshabelle State of Somalia (Somali: Dowlad Goboleedka Hirshabelle ee Soomaaliya), is a Federal Member State in south-central Somalia. It is bordered by Galmudug state of Somalia to the north, South West State of Somalia and Banadir region to the south, Ethiopia to the west and the Indian Ocean to the east. Jowhar is the capital state. 

Hirshabelle consists of the Hiran and Middle Shabelle regions of Somalia. The name of the state originates from combining their names. Hirshabelle proclaimed itself the autonomous Federal Member State of the Federal Republic of Somalia as stipulated in the provisional Constitution of Somalia.

History

Background 
The creation of the Hirshabelle State has long been controversial, as both regions, Hiran and Middle Shabelle, have expressed a desire to create their own separate regional states.

In October 2016, local presidential elections were held, which were won by Ali Abdullahi Osoble. On 11 March 2017, the Hirshabelle Parliament approved a new Cabinet of 52 Ministers. In September 2017, the Parliament elected a new President, Mohamed Abdi Ware. However, the new government is largely based in Mogadishu, and its authority is limited to only certain parts of the Middle Shabelle region and the city of Jowhar.

Population

Districts of Hiran Region

Districts of the Middle Shabelle region

Administration 
The President of Hirshabelle is an executive head of Hirshabelle State of Somalia; the president is both head of state and head of government. The President can appoint and dismiss Cabinet members.

Presidents 
For a comprehensive list of the presidents of Hirshabelle State of Somalia, see the List of presidents of Hirshabelle article. The current president of Hirshabelle is Ali Abdullahi Hussein.

Transport 
The road that passes through Jowhar and connects the cities of Jalalaqsi and Mogadishu is considered relatively safe. The road from Jalalaqsi to Buloburde serves as a supply route for the city of Buloburde, but may be subject to attacks by Al-Shabaab. The road from Bulobarde through the Halgan village in Beledwayne passes through Al-Shabab territory, and is therefore more susceptible to attacks by the group. At the same time, the movement of civil transport can be carried out through the territory of Al-Shabaab.

Climate

References

External links
 Somalia: Hirshabelle Solves Dispute Between Top Leadership
 Somalia: Following delays Hirshabelle President unveils cabinet
 Amisom launches Operation Antelope in HirShabelle state, Somalia
Отчет EASO — Информация о стране происхождения. Сомали. Ситуация в сфере безопасно 
 сти

States of Somalia